The 1874 Oxford University by-election was fought on 14 March 1874.  The by-election was fought due to the incumbent Conservative MP, Gathorne Hardy, becoming Secretary of State for War.  It was retained by the incumbent.

References

1874 elections in the United Kingdom
1874 in England
19th century in Oxfordshire
March 1874 events
By-elections to the Parliament of the United Kingdom in Oxford University
Unopposed ministerial by-elections to the Parliament of the United Kingdom in English constituencies